ELU or Elu may refer to:

Languages
 Elu, a Middle Indo-Aryan language, or Prakrit
 Elu language (Papua New Guinea) (ISO 639: elu), an Austronesian language

Places 
 Elu (woreda), an administrative ward of Ethiopia
 Guemar Airport, serving El Oued, Algeria

Fictional characters 
 Elu Thingol, a fictional character in J.R.R. Tolkien's Middle-earth legendarium
 Elu (comics), a fictional character from DC Comics

Other uses 
 Eastern Liaoning University, in Dandong, China
 English Lacrosse Union, now the English Lacrosse Association
 Exponential linear unit (neural networks)
 ELU, a German tool producer now part of DeWalt
 Elu, a title used in the Scottish Rite
Elu, a neopronoun used in the Portuguese language to refer to non-binary and gender-unspecified people